Liocranoides is a genus of American false wolf spiders that was first described by Eugen von Keyserling in 1881. They live in habitats with cold surfaces, such as caves. It was transferred from the sac spiders to the Tengellidae in 1967, which was later merged with Zoropsidae.

Species
 it contains five species, found Alabama, Georgia, Kentucky, North Carolina, Tennessee, and Virginia:
Liocranoides archeri Platnick, 1999 – USA
Liocranoides coylei Platnick, 1999 – USA
Liocranoides gertschi Platnick, 1999 – USA
Liocranoides tennesseensis Platnick, 1999 – USA
Liocranoides unicolor Keyserling, 1881 (type) – USA

See also
 List of Zoropsidae species

References

Araneomorphae genera
Spiders of the United States
Taxa named by Eugen von Keyserling
Zoropsidae